Malikat Jamal Al Kawn (MJK; English: "Miss Universe") is the sixth studio album by Lebanese Arabic Pop singer Haifa Wehbe, released on May 8, 2012. The Album contains 14 songs, a fusion of oriental and western music sung in three different dialects: Egyptian, Lebanese and Gulf Arabic.

Charts and critical reception
The album ranked #1 on iTunes Worldwide albums chart, being the first Lebanese artist to hold this position on the chart and the album has sold over 10,000,000 copies to date.

Singles
 “Bokra Bfarjik” was the first single. Its video was shot in Italy, directed by Giangi Magnoni and released on 10 May.
 The second single was “MJK” and its music video was shot in New York.
The third single was "Ezzay Ansak". It was released in 2013.

Track listing

Release history

References

External links
 Official Album Site
 Digital Booklet

Haifa Wehbe albums
2012 albums